The League of Communists of Serbia (SKS), founded as the Communist Party of Serbia (KPS) in 1945, was the Serbian branch of the League of Communists of Yugoslavia, the sole legal party of Yugoslavia from 1945 to 1990. It changed its name from KPS to SKS in 1952. Under a new constitution ratified in 1974, greater power was devolved to the various republic level branches. In the late 1980s, the party was taken over by a faction endorsing Slobodan Milošević to become leader of the party. Milošević appeased nationalists in Serbia by promising to reduce the level of autonomy within the autonomous provinces of Kosovo and Vojvodina. This policy increased ethnic tensions with the other republics and nationalities. During the early 1990s, the growing ethnic tensions between the republics of Yugoslavia led to the breakup of the federal party.

On July 27, 1990, it merged with several smaller parties to form the Socialist Party of Serbia.

During its existence the League of Communists of Kosovo and the League of Communists of Vojvodina were associated with it as "integral parts."

Party leaders 

Blagoje Nešković (1941 – 1948)
Petar Stambolić (1948 – March 1957)           
Jovan Veselinov (March 1957 – 4 November 1966)     
Dobrivoje Radosavljević (4 November 1966 – February 1968)     
Petar Stambolić (February 1968 – November 1968)   
Marko Nikezić (November 1968 – 26 October 1972)    
Tihomir Vlaškalić (26 October 1972 – May 1982)       
Dušan Čkrebić (May 1982 – 17 May 1984)  
Ivan Stambolić (17 May 1984 – May 1986)     
Slobodan Milošević (May 1986 – 24 May 1989)     
Bogdan Trifunović (24 May 1989 – 16 July 1990)

Congresses
I. (Founding) Congress – 8–12 May 1945
II. Congress – 17–21 January 1949
III. Congress – 26–29 April 1954
IV. Congress – 4–6 June 1959
V. Congress – 11–14 May 1965
VI. Congress – 21–23 November 1968
VII. Congress – 23–25 April 1974
VIII. Congress – 29–31 May 1978
IX. Congress – 1982
X. Congress – May 1986
XI. Congress – December 1989
XII. (Extraordinary) Congress – July 1990

See also
History of Serbia
League of Communists of Yugoslavia
League of Communists of Bosnia and Herzegovina
League of Communists of Croatia
League of Communists of Macedonia
League of Communists of Montenegro
League of Communists of Slovenia
League of Communists of Vojvodina
League of Communists of Kosovo
List of leaders of communist Yugoslavia
Socialist Federal Republic of Yugoslavia

References

Political parties established in 1941
Political parties disestablished in 1990
Parties of one-party systems
Communist parties in Serbia
Defunct political parties in Serbia
League of Communists of Yugoslavia
Socialist Party of Serbia
Socialist Republic of Serbia